The Santiago-Comaina Reserved Zone is a protected area in Peru located in the Amazonas Region, Condorcanqui Province.

See also 
 List of protected areas of Peru

External links 
 www.enjoyperu.com / Santiago-Comaina Reserved Zone(Spanish)

Reserved zones of Peru
Geography of Amazonas Region